Mark Winthrop Wood is an American electric violinist and the founder of Wood Violins, a company that makes electric violins. His educational program has been featured on news programs nationwide. He is also an Emmy-winning composer and a former member of the Trans-Siberian Orchestra.

Career

Education 

Mark Wood studied under Dr. Richard Rusack at Paul D. Schreiber High School in Port Washington, New York, before beginning his career with a full scholarship at the Juilliard School in New York and studied viola under William Lincer until he left. He then learned under the teachings of Richard Wright.

Musician 

Wood was one of the violinists and an original member of the symphonic rock group Trans-Siberian Orchestra, which he left in 2009. He has also played with Celine Dion, Billy Joel, Steve Vai, Westworld, and Lenny Kravitz. As a solo performer he has released seven CDs featuring his own versions of popular rock songs. On these CDs he is accompanied by "The Mark Wood Band" consisting of one member of the Trans-Siberian Orchestra, his wife Laura Kaye, his son Elijah Wood (on drums), and several other musicians.

Composer 

He is the founder of Mark Wood Music Productions, a company that creates music for the use in film and television. Wood received an Emmy award for the music of CBS-TVs coverage of the 2002 Tour de France. He also composed a piece for electric string quartet commissioned by the Juilliard School, which he himself attended, entitled Nest of Vipers.

Luthier 

After spending extensive time as a child in his father's woodworking shop, Wood built his first electric violin at age 10. In the 1970s, he gained notoriety from the stringed instrument community with his first solid-body electric violin and continued experimenting with numerous variations on this design in order to create an aesthetically appealing electric violin that would allow him to move freely while playing. It has since evolved into the Viper, a fretted, six-stringed electric violin with a patented chest support system. The Viper's T.F. Barrett line (which includes four-, five-, and six string-violins) uses the Barbera Transducer pickup. Their tonal character is a nice blend between acoustic and electric.

He owns Wood Violins, the producer of five lines of custom-made electric violins and cellos. Judy Kang, violinist for Lady Gaga's The Monster Ball Tour, uses one of Wood's Vipers. She can be seen performing a solo on her Viper in HBO's Lady Gaga Presents the Monster Ball Tour: At Madison Square Garden. In addition to Kang, Carrie Underwood's violinist, Jimmy Herman, uses a Wood Violin. Big and Rich's violinist, Shawn Bailey, performed with a Viper at the Country Music Awards and on Good Morning America.

Teacher 
Wood travels to over 60 schools annually all over the United States with his music education program Electrify Your Strings. The program brings together classical music with contemporary styles such as rock, jazz, and blues in order to provide a custom, hands-on learning experience. While Wood works primarily with the stringed instrument portion of the band, his wife, Laura Kaye works with the choir in order to invigorate interest for the school's entire music program within both the community and student body. In January 2008, his methods book Electrify your Strings was published, and he is currently in the midst of Electrify Your Strings' "Ultimate" tour.
He has also taught at the annual Mark O'Connor Fiddle Camps, and, in 2008, was elected to the board of the American String Teachers Association. He debuted the Mark Wood Rock Orchestra Camp (MWROC) in 2010, where he and many other high caliber world-class rock musicians hold a full week of workshops culminating in a final concert that includes all students and faculty. The camp is held each summer at MidAmerica Nazarene University.

On December 27, 2010, NBC's The Today Show aired a feature on the Electrify Your Strings! program filmed at an Oak Hills High School  in Cincinnati, Ohio.

Upcoming Roles 
Mark Wood has been cast in the upcoming “Harper and Fritz” series, playing the title character “Fritz”. “It’s an honor to have the opportunity to play such a magnificent role,” says Wood, “You can tell the writers really care about this character and he’s just so incredible to me. The amount of depth and emotion that he holds, it’s truly extraordinary”. The release date for the series is yet to be revealed.

Personal life 

Wood has three brothers, 2 who play the violin and 1 who plays the cello. His mother was a pianist and his father an abstract painter.

Discography
Voodoo Violince
Sanctuary
Portrait of an Artist
Shake Off the Gravity
Guts, Grace and Glory
Against the Grain
These Are a Few of My Favorite Things
Turbow

Notes

References

External links 
 Official website of Mark Wood
 Official site of Wood Violins
 Official site of the "Electrify Your Strings" program
 Official site of "Mark Wood Rock Orchestra Camp"

Living people
Year of birth missing (living people)
People from Port Washington, New York
American rock violinists
American male violinists
Trans-Siberian Orchestra members
Juilliard School alumni
Emmy Award winners
Paul D. Schreiber Senior High School alumni
21st-century American violinists
21st-century American male musicians